Chatyr-Dag is a mountainous massif in Crimea, near the Simferopol-Alushta highway. In the Crimean Tatar language çatır means tent and dağ means mountain.

Overview
The mountain consists of two plateaus: the lower (north) and the upper (south). The lower plateau slopes gently down to its northern side, which is covered in steppe grass. On its southern end (near the steep slope of the higher plateau), the lower plateau is covered with beech forests and juniper glades. It has many hiking trails and several beautiful caves (listed below). On the east side of the lower plateau there is a grove of yews.

The upper plateau has the shape of a giant bowl and on its rim; the highest peaks are each named. The upper plateau is covered with alpine meadows. Its slopes are very steep and offer some routes for multipitch climbing (rock climbing routes longer than length of one climbing rope). The highest peak is Eklizi-Bourun (1527 m above sea level).

Caves in the Chatyr-Dag massif include:
 Marble Caves
 Emine Bair Hosar cave
 Fur-tree cave
 Obvalnaya cave
 Vyalova cave
 Artuch-Koba
 Vyalova cave system

See also
Mangup
The Valley Of Ghosts
Kara Dag Mountain

External links

Crimean Mountains
One-thousanders of Ukraine